Delhi Smashers was a badminton franchise owned by Krrish Group for the Indian Badminton League. The team's home ground is DDA Badminton and Squash Stadium in Delhi. The team was captained by Jwala Gutta.

Current squad

2013 season

Delhi Smashers failed to qualify for semi-finals and finished fifth in the league table, with 13 points.

References

See also

Indian Badminton League

Sports clubs in Delhi
Premier Badminton League teams